Reference ranges for urine tests are described below:

See also
 Reference range
 Reference ranges for blood tests

References

Nephrology